Andrew Leith Adams FRSE, FRS (21 March 1827 – 29 July 1882) was a Scottish physician, naturalist and geologist. He was the father of the writer Francis Adams.

Life and career
Adams was the son of Francis Adams (1796–1861), a surgeon and Espeth Shaw. He studied medicine and joined as an army physician in 1848, serving in the 22nd Infantry Regiment in India. Between 1849–1854 he was posted in Dagshai, Rawalpindi and Peshawar. He also served in Kashmir, Egypt, Malta (1861–1868), Gibraltar and Canada. He married Bertha Jane Grundy on 26 October 1859, who later became famous as a novelist.

He spent his spare time studying the natural history of these countries. He was among the first to study the interior of Ladakh and wrote about it in "The Birds of Cashmere and Ladakh". The orange bullfinch (Pyrrhula aurantiaca) was discovered by him as also the first breeding site of brown-headed gulls (Larus brunnicephalus) in the lakes of the Tibetan plateau. In 1868, following twenty years of service in the army, he was promoted to surgeon-major.

After his retirement from the army in 1873, Adams was professor of natural history at Trinity College, Dublin and Queen's College, Cork. He was elected a fellow of the Geographical Society in 1870 a fellow of the Royal Society of Edinburgh in 1872, and Fellow of the Royal Society in 1873.
He died of a pulmonary haemorrhage on 29 July 1883 at Rushbrook Villa (Cork).

He published Wanderings of a Naturalist in India, the Western Himalayas and Cashmere (1867), Notes of a Naturalist in the Nile Valley and Malta (1871) and Field and Forest Rambles (1873).

He is commemorated in the black-winged snowfinch Montifringilla adamsi and in the genus of the Pleistocene giant dormouse of Malta and Sicily Leithia melitensis and Leithia cartei. In 1868 Leith Adams described the very large form of giant dormouse from the Maqhlaq cave as Myoxus melitensis and the smaller form as Myoxus cartei. Later, Richard Lydekker assigned the two species to a new genus, named Leithia in honour of Leith Adams in 1895.

Publications
 
 
  2 plates, July 1862-Jan. 1863.
  4 figures, 1864.
 
 Adams, A.L. (1870). Notes of a naturalist in the Nile Valley and Malta. 195pp. Edinburgh (Edmonton and Douglas).
  plates I–XXII.
 Adams, A.L. (1874). Concluding Report on the Maltese Fossil Elephants. Report of the British Association for 1873, 185–187.

References

Attribution

Other sources
 Anon (19 August 1882) Obituary: Andrew Leith Adams, M.B., F.R.S. The British Medical Journal 2(1129):338

External links
 Wanderings of a naturalist in India, Archive.org

Fellows of the Royal Society
Fellows of the Royal Society of Edinburgh
Naturalists of British India
Irish naturalists
Academics of Queens College Cork
Fellows of Trinity College Dublin
1827 births
1882 deaths
British ornithologists
Indian ornithologists